Sant'Ambrogio sul Garigliano is a comune (municipality) in the Province of Frosinone in the Italian region Lazio, located about  southeast of Rome and about  southeast of Frosinone.

Sant'Ambrogio sul Garigliano borders the following municipalities: Rocca d'Evandro, Sant'Andrea del Garigliano, Sant'Apollinare. During World War II, due to its position across the Gustav Line, it was mostly destroyed.

Twin towns
 Sant'Ambrogio di Torino, since 2004
 Sant'Ambrogio di Valpolicella, since 2004

References

External links
 Official website
  Sant'Ambrogio sul Garigliano's cemetery

Cities and towns in Lazio